Sir William Whetstone (died 1711) was an officer of the Royal Navy in the later 17th and early eighteenth century.  He eventually rose to the rank of rear admiral, having spent his career serving with several distinguished figures.

Family and early life
Whetstone appears to have been born into a naval family, his father John Whetstone had probably been a naval officer.  William established himself in Bristol, becoming a member of Bristol corporation and commanding a merchant ship, the Mary of Bristol, with which he carried out trading with Virginia and Barbados.  His trading appears to have been in a wide variety of goods, including serge.

He appears to have married a woman named Sarah by 1677, and that year he took an apprenticeship that would last until 1684. This marriage produced two sons and two daughters, his eldest daughter, also named Sarah, married the naval officer Woodes Rogers.  William's first wife died in 1698 and was buried in the church of St Nicholas's, Bristol, on 19 October 1698.

Naval career
William entered navy service, being appointed on 30 July 1689 to command the hired ship Europa, and he spent the next two years conveying supplies to Ireland.  He was then briefly appointed to command HMS Portsmouth from 3 February to 12 August 1691.  Here he came to the attention of Admiral Edward Russell, who described him as 'a good man'.  He did not however exert himself on Whetstone's behalf, and William spent 1692 unemployed.  He returned to active duty in 1693, at first as the part owner of the privateer Delavall, and later receiving a commission to command HMS Norfolk which was then being built at Southampton.  She was launched on 27 March 1693, and Whetstone proceeded to man the ship.  He was discharged from her on 23 May. A series of brief commands followed before he took command of HMS York from 13 July 1693 to 13 June 1695.

In the Atlantic and Caribbean
Whetstone's next command was to HMS Dreadnought on 6 July 1696.  He sailed her to Newfoundland, spending the next three years on the station, being finally discharged on 13 July 1699.  The command of HMS Yarmouth followed, lasting from 19 May 1700 to 4 June 1701, when Whetstone was promoted to commodore and was moved to the York at the head of the squadron dispatched to Jamaica.  He attempted to set sail, but was twice forced to return to Plymouth for repairs.  He then made better progress, but soon had to put into Cork.  She was then surveyed and pronounced unfit for the journey to the West Indies.  Whetstone instead took command of HMS Canterbury on 4 February 1702 and was finally able to cross the Atlantic.  He arrived in the West Indies in May, joining the fleet at Port Royal under the command of Vice-Admiral John Benbow.  Benbow gave him the local rank of rear-admiral.

By now the War of the Spanish Succession had broken out, and news of its declaration reached Benbow on 7 July.  He detached Whetstone and six ships to search off Port St Louis in Hispaniola for a French squadron under Admiral Jean du Casse, which it was believed would call at the port on his voyage to Cartagena, from where he might raid English and Dutch shipping.  After Whetstone had left, Benbow took his squadron and sailed for Cartagena, anticipating that either he or Whetstone would find Du Casse and bring him to battle. On 5 August 1702, Whetstone led two English warships in an attempt to capture the town of Arecibo in the Spanish colony of Puerto Rico. Two rowboats with marines and sailors landed on Arecibo's beach, but were repulsed by Spanish colonial militia led by Antonio de los Reyes Correa. Correa mustered thirty men who were equipped with spears and machetes, as muskets were in short supply in the colony. The English landing force suffered twenty-two casualties on the beach and eight on Whetstone's warships from disparate Spanish cannonfire, with the captain of the landing force being among them. After this defeat when Whetstone reached Hispaniola, Du Casse had already departed, and it was Benbow who eventually found Du Casse.  After the unsatisfactory conclusion of his most famous action, a wounded Benbow returned to Port Royal, meeting up with Whetstone who had returned from cruising off Hispaniola.

Benbow then ordered the trial by court martial of several of his captains for cowardice and disobedience they had shown during the action. Whetstone was president of the courts martial, Benbow being too ill to take the role himself.  Benbow died on 4 November 1702, and Whetstone took over the command of the Jamaica Station. He held it until June 1703, when he was superseded by Vice-Admiral John Graydon.  Whetstone went on to engage and destroy a number of privateers off San Domingo but an attempt on the French colony at Placentia had to be abandoned because of the weather, the island's defences, and sickness in the fleet.  Whetstone and Graydon then departed Jamaica, with Whetstone returning to England in October 1703.

Promotion
Prince George promoted Whetstone to rear-admiral of the blue in January 1704.  This was a measure designed to show both approval of his conduct whilst holding acting rank, and at the same time to separate him from charges arising against Graydon.  The promotion caused controversy however, as it was done over the heads of other captains, including Sir James Wishart.  Wishart was serving under Sir George Rooke, who threatened to resign over the issue. Wishart was then made a rear-admiral of the blue as well, and made senior to Whetstone through antedating his commission.  Whetstone was given command of a squadron in the English Channel in March 1704, and was promoted to rear-admiral of the white on 18 January 1705.  The appointment to the post of commander-in-chief in the West Indies came on 17 February, with a knighthood five days later on 22 February.

He raised his flag aboard HMS Montagu and arrived at Jamaica to take up his post in mid May.  He was largely thwarted though by the weakness of the ships under his command.  The smaller vessels were able to take several valuable prizes, but he was not strong enough to allow him to attack any Spanish settlements.  He hoped to convince the governor of Cartagena to declare in favour of King Charles, but received the reply that the governor 'knew no sovereign but King Philip’.  Whetstone continued to persist though, and in 1706, he and Governor Handyside attempted to persuade the Spanish colonies at Cuba and Cartagena to declare in favour of Charles.  Whetstone was relieved later that year by a squadron under William Kerr, and returned to England in December 1706.

Final actions and fall from grace
Whetstone was given command of a squadron in May 1707, and ordered to operate off Dunkirk against Claude de Forbin, a dangerous corsair.  In June he was ordered to escort a convoy of nineteen ships of the Muscovy Company as far as the Shetland Islands.  He sailed with them until they were well past Shetland, before returning home.  The convoy was later intercepted by Forbin, who was able to capture fifteen of the merchants.  Though the orders were at fault for being insufficient in their scope, and Whetstone had fulfilled them in full, the Muscovy Company was outraged.  A trial was held at which Whetstone was accused of leaving the ships to be attacked.  The Admiralty defended him, but eventually Whetstone was made the scapegoat.  He was dismissed from his command and received no further employment.  He died in 1711, and was buried with at St Michael's, Bristol on 3 April 1711. He had been remarried by this time to Mary (or Maria), with whom he had a daughter, named Mary.  At the time of his death, Whetstone was owed the substantial sum of £2500 by various debtors.

References

Sources

External links
William Whetstone at the National Maritime Museum
 

1711 deaths
British naval commanders in the War of the Spanish Succession
Royal Navy admirals
Year of birth unknown